Universal Links on Human Rights is a memorial sculpture located in Dublin, Ireland, on the traffic island at the junction of Amiens Street, Beresford Place, and Memorial Road, close to Busáras and The Customs House. It is a sphere of welded interlinked chains and bars, 260 cm in diameter, housing an eternal flame in its center, powered by natural gas. It was commissioned by Amnesty International in 1995 and designed by Tony O'Malley. It represents the jails holding prisoners of conscience.

References

External links
 Photo at Flickr

Eternal flames
Monuments and memorials in the Republic of Ireland
Buildings and structures in Dublin (city)
Amnesty International
Tourist attractions in Dublin (city)
Irish sculpture